Mother is a 1910 play which was the first successful play by Jules Eckert Goodman.

The play was first performed on March 7, 1910 in Plainfield, New Jersey.  Produced by William A. Brady, it debuted on Broadway on September 7, 1910 at the Hackett Theatre.  It played at the Hackett through December 3, 1910, and then moved to the Circle(?) Theatre, where it opened on December 5 and ran through December 31, for a total run of 133 performances.

The play was adapted to the screen in a 1914 silent film of the same name.

1910 Broadway cast
 Emma Dunn as Mrs. Katherine Wetherill
 Frederick Perry as William Howard Wetherill
 Albert Latcha as Walter Thompson Wetherill
 Arthur Ross as James Bingham Wetherill
 David Ross as John Walton Wetherill
 Minnette Barrett as Ardath Wetherill
 Marion Capman as Leonore Wetherill
 James Brophy as John Rufus Chase
 John Stokes as Harry Lake
 Jane Corcoran as Elizabeth Terhune
 Justine Cutting as Agatha

References

External links
 Mother on the Internet Broadway Database
 New York Public Library production photos
 Mother (1911) (book version of play on Google books)

1910 plays
Broadway plays
American plays